Aulolaimidae is a family of nematodes belonging to the order Araeolaimida.

Genera:
 Aegialoalaimus de Man, 1907
 Aulolaimus de Man, 1880
 Gymnolaimus
 Mehdilaimus Prabha, 1974
 Pseudoaulolaimus Imamura, 1931

References

Nematodes